Nupserha gahani is a species of beetle in the family Cerambycidae. It was described by Gestro in 1895.

References

gahani
Beetles described in 1895